World of Echo is the second studio album by American musician Arthur Russell, released in 1986 on Upside Records in the US and in 1987 on Rough Trade Records in the UK. The album is comprised primarily of Russell's vocals, cello playing, and percussion, which are prominently treated with effects such as delay and reverb.

World of Echo was the final album released by Russell during his lifetime. It was widely reissued in 2005 by Audika and Rough Trade. The album was named the best of the 1980s by Fact in 2013. It was ranked the 25th best album of the 1980s by Pitchfork in 2018.

Background and composition
World of Echo has been noted as prominently incorporating Russell's "folksy tenor, cello, and scant electronic microtones". It features Russell's employment of production effects, including prominent use of echo, reverb, and distortion. Several songs included are alternate versions of dance tracks that Russell produced as 12-inch singles, including "Let's Go Swimming", "Wax the Van", and "Treehouse".

Writing for Pitchfork, Cameron Macdonald noted that Russell's style of cello playing, often improvised, makes use of sporadic, imaginary sounds like "hollow thuds, window-washing brushes, chipped strings, knuckled knacks, and the boom of a floor peg dropping on concrete". He also commented that the cello "startlingly duets with his voice", leading to inharmonic sounds that makes it sound like the instrument "clears its throat during his awkward moments". AllMusic referred to the album as a collection of "spare, dubby cello experiments." Dusted also commented on the album's "skeletal framework", with "bare melodies rising to the surface, vocal lines encompassing wordless singing" and "constantly shifting textures swirling throughout".

Release
When the album failed to perform well commercially, Russell reportedly requested that stickers be added to the packaging with the word "unintelligible."

Audika Records issued a remastered limited edition CD in 2004 which included bonus tracks and a DVD with footage by Phill Niblock. They subsequently reissued it on CD and LP in 2005. Rough Trade also reissued the album that year.

Critical reception

The album was released in the UK on March 30, 1987. In Q, Andy Gill said, "On this LP, unfortunately, the imagination displayed on the three mixes of [previous single] 'Let's Go Swimming' is all but completely absent", and that the titles of the songs "betray Arthur as just another art bore caught on the less meaningful fringes of New Age muzak. A big disappointment." Jonathan Romney of NME stated that "World of Echo contains some of Russell's golden greats, but the catch is that they're virtually unrecognisable", and that "the effect is almost like a chilly version of John Martyn at his spaciest". Romney concluded that "it's fun watching the patterns change, but you sometimes get tired waiting for something to happen". However, in Melody Maker, David Stubbs also noted the similarities to Martyn's Solid Air and said that the album "works", describing the music as "a fuzz, a blur, a rich, throbbing pulse, a signal in space", and Russell's vocals as "clotted, opaque, word-shapes in the clouds". He called the result "a giant, subterranean repository of Dub", and said, "what's at work is the old dub trick of suggesting what's not there, what's been dispensed with".

Accolades
In 2013, the album was ranked at number 301 on NMEs list of the 500 greatest albums of all time. in the same year, it was also named the best album of the 1980s by Fact. In 2018, it was ranked the 25th best album of the 1980s by Pitchfork.

Track listing

Personnel 
People involved in the making of this album include:

 Arthur Russell – cello, vocals, hand percussion, echo

Technical personnel
 Arthur Russell – producer, liner notes
 Ernie Brooks – producer
 Steve Cellum – producer
 Ray Janos – remastering
 Janet Perr – artwork
 Steve Knutson – reissue executive producer
 Tom Lee – reissue executive producer
 Phill Niblock – producer
 Peter Zummo – producer

In popular culture
In 2016, American rapper and producer Kanye West sampled a section from Russell's "Answers Me" in his song "30 Hours".

References 

1986 albums
Arthur Russell (musician) albums
Rough Trade Records albums
Experimental music albums
Art pop albums
Dub albums
Ambient pop albums
Electroacoustic music albums